Monika Dahlberg (born 1936) is a German singer, and film and television actress.

She studied in Kiel as an actress and opera singer. In 1957 she signed a three-year contract with Constantin Film, and featured in several comedies and heimatfilm. From the 1960s onwards she increasingly appeared on television as well. Dahlberg also worked as a voice actress, dubbing foreign films for release in German market.

Her brother Wolfgang Rödelberger was a composer. She was married to the actor Klaus Kindler.

Selected filmography
 Greetings and Kisses from Tegernsee (1957)
 The Csardas King (1958)
 I'll Carry You in My Arms (1958)
 Mandolins and Moonlight (1959)
 The Scarlet Baroness (1959)
 Isola Bella (1961)
 What Is Father Doing in Italy? (1961)
 I Must Go to the City (1962)
 Onkel Filser – Allerneueste Lausbubengeschichten (1966)
 I Am Looking for a Man (1966)
 Zur Hölle mit den Paukern (1968)
 We'll Take Care of the Teachers (1970)
 Morgen fällt die Schule aus (1971)
  (1975)

References

Bibliography

External links

1936 births
Living people
German film actresses
German television actresses